is a city located in Tokushima Prefecture, Japan. , the city had an estimated population of 27,713 in 12547 households and a population density of 75 persons per km2.

Name 
The name Mima (美馬) is derived from two characters meaning "Beautiful Horse".  Mima was once home to many horse breeders.  Although breeders and keepers are not so common in present-day Mima, the history lives on today in art, local products, and such.

Ikezuki 
There is also the story of a famous horse named Ikezuki.  He is a famous horse born from a captive Mima Town mother and a wild father from Mount Tsurugi.  He later belonged to Shōgun Minamoto no Yoritomo and often makes appearances throughout history, such as in Tale of Heike, Genpei War, and The Battle of Uji (1184) (crossing the Uji River).  Ikezuki's mother was buried at what is now Ikezuki Park.  It is unsure whether Ikezuki is a factual or fictional character.

Geography
Mima is located in north-central Tokushima Prefecture on the island of Shikoku. Almost the entire area of ​​Tokushima Prefecture and the mainland of Kagawa Prefecture is within a 50 kilometer radius of the city. The city is located in the lower reaches of the Yoshino River. The plains (northern part) have a Seto Inland Sea climate with less rain, and the mountainous areas (southern part) have a more rainy Pacific Ocean climate. Especially in mountainous areas, it is not uncommon for roads to freeze and snow in winter.
There are many steep slopes in the mountainous areas, and traditional steep slope farming to prevent soil erosion is used. The Yoshino River flows west–east through Mima. It is the second longest river in Shikoku, boasting a length of 194 km. It is a popular spot for fishing, kayaking, and rafting. Mount Tsurugi, the second highest mountain in Shikoku, is on the border of Mima, Naka District and Miyoshi District. The Nakoyama Highlands just east of Mt. Tsurugi, had wide slopes with many bungalows, cottages, and RV parks open from April through the end of November. One face of the mountain has a famous grass ski area, hosting the Annual World Championships with the longest run stretching 500 meters and descending 62 meters. Flowing from south to north through the town of Anabuki and the village of Koyadaira is the Anabuki River.  Its sources are a collection of many streams from around the Mt. Tsurugi area, and is popular for its cleanliness. As of 2005, the Anabuki River has held its position as the cleanest river in Shikoku for 11 years. There is a thriving population of the Japanese fishes ayu, amego, and iwana.  The upstream town of Koyadaira hosts the Amego Fishing Competition every year in April.

 Rivers: Yoshino River, Anabuki River, Sadamitsu River
 Mountains: Mount Tsurugi, Mount Nako

Neighbouring municipalities 
Tokushima Prefecture
 Mima
 Yoshinogawa
 Kamiita
Kagawa Prefecture
 Sanuki
 Higashikagawa

Climate
Mima has a humid subtropical climate (Köppen climate classification Cfa) with hot summers and cool winters. Precipitation is high, but there is a pronounced difference between the wetter summers and drier winters.

Demographics
Per Japanese census data, the population of Mima in 2020 is 28,055 people. Mima has been conducting censuses since 1950.

About 20.1% is inhabitable land.

History
As with all of Tokushima Prefecture, the area of Mima was part of ancient Awa Province.  During the Edo period, the area was part of the holdings of Tokushima Domain ruled by the Hachisuka clan from their seat at Tokushima Castle. Following the Meiji restoration, it was organized into villages within Mima District with the creation of the modern municipalities system on October 1, 1889, including the town of Waki and the villages of Anabuki, Kozato and Shigekiyo. The city of Anabuki was raised to town status on January 26, 1924, and Kozato on December 10, 1940. Kozato and Shgekiyo merged to form the town of Mima on March 31, 1957. The city of Mima was established on March 1, 2005, from the merger of the former towns of Mima, Anabuki and  Waki (all from Mima District) and the village of Koyadaira from Oe District.

Government
Mima has a mayor-council form of government with a directly elected mayor and a unicameral city council of 18 members. Mima contributes two members to the Tokushima Prefectural Assembly. In terms of national politics, the city is part of Tokushima 2nd district of the lower house of the Diet of Japan.

Economy
The economy of Mima is primarily agricultural.

Education
Mima has nine public elementary schools and seven public middle schools operated by the city government and three public high schools operated by the Tokushima Prefectural Department of Education.

High schools
 Anabuki High School
 Wakimachi High School
 Mima Commercial High School

Junior high schools

 Ehara Junior High School
 Wakimachi Junior High School
 Iwakura Junior High School
 Mima Junior High School
 Mishima Junior High School
 Anabuki Junior High School
 Koyadaira Junior High School

Elementary schools

 South Ehara Elementary School
 North Ehara Elementary School
 Shimizu Elementary School
 East Ehara Elementary School (Closed from April 2011)
 Wakimachi Elementary School
 Iwakura Elementary School
 Shibasaka Elementary School
 Kozato Elementary School
 Kirai Elementary School
 North Shigekiyo Elementary School
 East Shigekiyo Elementary School
 West Shigekiyo Elementary School
 Mishima Elementary School
 Anabuki Elementary School
 Hatsukusa Elementary School (Closed from April 2011)
 Miyauchi Elementary School
 Koyadaira Elementary School

Transportation

Airports
Mima is serviced by Takamatsu Airport and Tokushima Airport.  There are no airports in Mima.
Takamatsu Airport is located 35–40 km north of Mima, in Takamatsu, Kagawa Prefecture. It can be accessed by Route 193.  From the City Hall, it takes approximately 40 minutes by car.
Tokushima Airport is located 52 km east of Mima, in Tokushima.  By highway, it takes approximately 50 minutes by car.

Railways
Three train stations serve Mima (in east–west order):
 Shikoku Railway Company – Tokushima Line
 -  -

Highways
  Tokushima Expressway. Two interchanges allow access, Wakimachi I.C. and Mima I.C.
 , running east–west from Tokushima to Saijō, Ehime.
 , running north–south from Takamatsu, Kagawa through Mima, eventually making its way to Tokushima.

Local attractions
Kōzato temple ruins, National Historic Site

Udatsu Townscape

Straight from the Edo and Meiji eras, Udatsu Townscape is a symbol of Wakimachi's old days.  Characteristic of the buildings are the presence of “Udatsu,” extensions of the roof that served as protection from the spread of fires.  Udatsu were also symbols of fortune, and continue to proclaim the prosperity of the merchants even today.  The charm of the old town continues to excite nostalgia, as the broadcast industry often features it in television dramas and commercials.  The national government recognized Udatsu Street as an “Important Preservation District for Groups of Historic Buildings” in December 1988.

Wakimachi and Odeon theaters

Originally constructed in 1934, Wakimachi Theater was a playhouse for kabuki, rōkyoku (storytelling accompanied with shamisen music), and other such entertainment.  In the post-WWII era, it became a movie theater, and was then closed in 1995.  It was scheduled for demolition, but after Shōchiku Films decided to use it as a location in their famous film, “The Man Who Catches Rainbows,” it was brought back into the limelight. The theater underwent restoration in 1999.

Teramachi
Teramachi, which means "Temple Town," has many Buddhist temples in a small area, including , which was probably built during the Nara period, featuring a traditional landscaped garden complete with a pond and stream.   which is the oldest Jōdo Shinshū temple in Shikoku. Anraku-ji features a Noh stage, hosting Noh and other such plays from the local Noh Appreciation Group.  There is also  of the same movement, and Rinshō-ji.

Dannozukaana Kofun Cluster
Built approximately 1400 years ago, these tombs are large dome-shaped rooms at the end of a short tunnel.  Having been designated as a National Historical Site in 1942, its unique structure continues to be studied today.  Relics from the tombs are kept in nearby Tera-machi.
The large tomb, to the east, is called the “Drum Tomb”.  The mound itself measures 13 meters while the height and width inside measures 4.3 m and 3.4 m, respectively.  Including the tunnel, the length of the mound is measured at 37 m. 
The second tomb, to the west, is called the “Shelf Tomb”.  Length is 20 m, height is 8.7 m, while height and width inside is 2.8 m and 2.0 m, respectively.

Aoki Residence

The late Mr. Aoki returned from Nagasaki to his hometown, Mima.  He built a large Taisho-era mansion as a retirement home for himself and his wife.  His wife worked in the large herb garden and made bamboo spatulas from morning to evening. The house stood vacant for 30 years, before the Aokis, now living in Osaka, donated the house to its hometown, Mima. The Aoki Residence is located on 3,590 m2 of land, with a 2 meter high wall surrounding it.  The main building includes several old fashioned rooms, featuring both tatami and clay floors.  There is also a two-story warehouse and other small buildings. Today, the Aoki Residence holds many events, including but not limited to gatherings of local residents and enthusiasts interested in pottery, indigo dye, flower arranging, dancing, shamisen, etc.  It may also be used for wedding receptions.

Miki Residence

The Miki Family Residence was built during the Edo Period.  The Miki family was famous for preserving many historic Kamakura period¥Kamakura and Muromachi period documents from the surrounding Koyadaira and Yamakawa area.  The house was recognized as an important cultural heritage site and remains today as one of the oldest houses in Tokushima.  The grounds feature the main house, as well as several small buildings, mostly for storage.  There is also a museum and garden, featuring many cherry blossom trees.  The museum and residence is closed from December to March.  The garden is best seen in April, when the cherry blossoms are blooming.

Former Nagaoka residence
The former Nagaoka residence(旧長岡家住宅 Kyū Nagaoka-ke Jūtaku) was originally located at the foot of the southern slopes of the Sanuki Mountains. In 1976 the residence was designated a National  Important Cultural Property. In 1979 it was disassembled and reassabled in the Wakimachi area. The house is 12 meters long and 6,6 meters wide. It has a  thatched roof. The outside walls are made from mud and earth. This is characteristic for houses on the foot of the southern slopes of the Sanuki mountains (due to the lack of rainfall).

Ikezuki Park

Created as a tribute to Mima's pride, Ikezuki, this park also serves as the resting place for Ikezuki's mother (horse).  It features a rock garden, picnic area, and restroom facilities.

Specialized products

Indigo dye
The aizome season lasts from April to July and again from September to October.

Cymbidium
Cymbidium is a variety of Western-style orchid.  The orchid is one of the most advanced plants in evolutionary history.  Of these, the Cymbidium is one of the world's most cultivated.  The orchid blooms from late November to March.

Paper umbrellas
Around 1955, there were about 200 stores lined up that were dedicated to the art of making paper umbrella in Mima. Today, two of the shops still exist. The masters of this traditional art construct the frame from bamboo, apply Japanese paper dyed with indigo, then oil it and apply various decorations, finishing it with a coat of lacquer.

Yuzu
Yuzu is first harvested in late fall. It is a yellow fruit that is common around the Mt. Tsurugi area as the weather breaks into winter. In recent years, the local farmers in the Koyadaira area have been producing yuzu using organic compost, with little or no agricultural chemicals.  Lately, the product has been diversified with products such as organic yuzu ponzu and so on.

Hassaku oranges

Hassaku oranges are harvested just as the frost begins to strengthen, at the end of December. They are then immediately put into storage until they ripen in February, after which they are shipped.  In the Anabuki area, eco-farming efforts are being introduced as chemicals and fertilizers are being reduced and cut.

Grapes
In Mima, Delaware and Berry-A varieties of grapes are produced.  They are harvested in two waves, one in mid-July and the other in mid-August.  In Wakimachi, eco-farming efforts are being introduced as chemicals and fertilizers are being reduced and cut.

Blueberries
Blueberries are a healthy food well known for their power to keep the eyes active, refresh the capillaries, and fight oxidation and the effects of aging.  In Mima, “The Association for the Research of Blueberries” was established whose aim is to find new products and uses for blueberries.

Events

Homemade raft competition

Each year, Anabuki hosts the Ikada Kudari, a homemade raft competition.  Several teams prepare for the event by building rafts of various shapes and sizes.  On the day of the event, the teams ride, pull, and push their rafts down a stretch of the Anabuki River.  Awards are given, including the fastest and the most unusual rafts.

Noted people from Mima
 Yasutaka Hattori, former professional Baseball pitcher
 Kuishinbo Kamen, Professional wrestler (Real Name: Akinori Tsukioka, Nihongo: 月岡 明則, Tsukioka Akinori)

References

External links

 Mima City official website 
 Mima City official website 
 Awanavi Tourism Site 
 Blue Travel Journal 

Cities in Tokushima Prefecture
Mima, Tokushima